Aldo Maria Lazzarín Stella (1926–2010) was the Italian-born in Selva di Volpago del Montello, Italy. Roman Catholic bishop of the Roman Catholic Apostolic Vicariate of Aisén, Chile. He died in Aysen, Chile.

Notes

20th-century Roman Catholic bishops in Chile
Italian Roman Catholic bishops in South America
1926 births
2010 deaths
Roman Catholic bishops of Aysén